Rafael Hidalgo Laurel, better known as Cholo by his peers (born July 26, 1961) is a Filipino filmmaker best known for writing and directing the Star Cinema Classic Nasaan Ka Man.

Being the youngest son of Manuel Sosa Laurel (deceased) and Lilia Dayrit Hidalgo (deceased), he was born in the Laurel compound in San Juan on July 26, 1961. He has four siblings named Victor (deceased), Gina, Amy (deceased) and Rico

He was educated at the University of the Philippines College of Broadcast Communications (1986), School of Continuing and Professional Studies - New York University (1995) and the London Academy for Film and TV ( 2007) and has been directing TV commercials and music videos since 1996.

His debut film, Nasaan Ka Man (Wherever you are), a love story/thriller produced by ABS-CBN films, swept most major awards in the FAMAS (Filipino Academy of Movie Arts and Sciences) Awards 2006 such as Best Director, Best Picture, Best Story and Best Screenplay. He is also a recipient of the Gawad Tanglaw Best Director Award given by Critics from the Academic Circle.

Cholo is based in the Philippines and continues to direct TV commercials around the Asian region.

External links
Newspaper Write up: The Manila Bulletin
Cholo Laurel's Website
ABS CBN: Nasaan Ka Man

Filipino film directors
Filipino television directors
Filipino screenwriters
University of the Philippines alumni
New York University alumni
Living people
1961 births
Cholo
Filipino people of English descent
Filipino people of Spanish descent
People from Metro Manila
ABS-CBN people